An interview is a type of conversation.

Interview may also refer to:

Film and television
 Interview (1971 film), a Bengali film by Mrinal Sen
 Interview (1973 film), an Indian Malayalam film
 Interview (1979 film), a Canadian film by Caroline Leaf and Veronika Soul
 Intervista or Interview, a 1987 Italian film
 The Interview (1995 film)
 The Interview (1998 film), an Australian film by Craig Monahan
 Interview (2003 film), a Dutch film by Theo van Gogh
 Interview (2007 film), an American remake by Steve Buscemi of the Dutch film
 Interview (2010 film), a German film by Sebastian Marka
 The Interview, a 2014 American film by Seth Rogen and Evan Goldberg
 Interview (TV series), a 2018 Australian chat show hosted by Andrew Denton
 "The Interview" (M*A*S*H), a television episode

Music
 Interview (album), a 1976 album by Gentle Giant
 Interviews (album), a 1982 Bob Marley interview album
 Interview (band), a pop/rock band from Bath, Somerset, England

Other
 Interview (magazine), a magazine founded by Andy Warhol in 1969
 Interview (research)
 Interview (journalism)
 Interview Island, one of the Andaman Islands, India

See also
 Q&A (disambiguation)